The  are a network of eighteen observation platforms and beacons dating to the early Edo period and located in the Sakishima Islands, Okinawa Prefecture, Japan. Erected in 1644 by the government of the Ryūkyū Kingdom at the instigation of the Satsuma overlords, at a time of international tension during the transition between the Ming and the Qing Dynasties of China, the beacons were responsible for monitoring and reporting on maritime traffic, with a view to restricting foreign vessels in accordance with the Tokugawa policy of sakoku, i.e. national seclusion. After an initial survey by the Council for the Protection of Cultural Properties in 1993, due to uncertainties over land rights and difficulties of coordination between the involved municipalities, it was not until 2007 that they were jointly designated an Historic Site.

Locations
There are eight beacons in the Miyako Islands and ten in the Yaeyama Islands. Of those in the Miyako Islands, five are within the city of Miyakojima (on the islands of Miyakojima, Ikema, and Kurima), and three in the village of Tarama (on the islands of Tarama and Minna). Of those in the Yaeyama Islands, two are within the city of Ishigaki (on the island of Ishigaki), seven in the town of Taketomi (on the islands of Taketomi, Kuroshima, Upper and Lower Aragusuku, Hateruma, Kohamajima, and Hatoma), and one in the town of Yonaguni (on the island of Yonaguni).

Operations
Records suggest that the beacon near Cape Hirakubo on Ishigaki was at one point manned by a team of four, who also slept on the site. A different signal may have been given depending upon the origin of the ships. A restaged beacon relay in November 2007 saw an attempt to pass signals along two routes: (1) Hateruma-Aragukusu (Shimoji)-Aragusuku (Kamiji)-Kuroshima-Taketomi-Ishigaki; and (2) Hatoma-Kohamajima-Taketomi-Ishigaki. Along both routes the initial signal could not be seen from the next observation platform, due to rain; after restarting from the second station, both signals were successfully relayed to Ishigaki; in some instances it took up to ten minutes from the signal being observed for a fire to be lit sufficient for the smoke to be seen at the next station; the exercise highlighted the difficulty in transmitting signals by such a method in times of inclement weather and poor visibility.

List of beacons

See also

 Dejima
 List of Historic Sites of Japan (Okinawa)

References

Sakishima Islands
History of Okinawa Prefecture
1640s establishments in Japan
Historic Sites of Japan
Coastal fortifications
Beacons
Ishigaki, Okinawa
Miyakojima, Okinawa
Taketomi, Okinawa
Tarama, Okinawa
Yonaguni, Okinawa